The Autonomous Region of Príncipe is an autonomous administrative division of the Republic of São Tomé and Príncipe. As defined by the constitution of São Tomé and Príncipe, the Autonomous Region of Príncipe has a Regional Assembly and a Regional Government. Its population was 7,324 at the 2012 census; the latest official estimate was 8,420. It consists of a single district: Pagué. Its seat is the town Santo António.

Islands 
The main island of the autonomous region is Príncipe. Smaller offshore islets are:
 Ilhéu Bom Bom
 Ilhéu Caroço
 Tinhosa Grande
 Tinhosa Pequena

History 

In 1995, a few years after the country's democratic transition, Príncipe became an autonomous region. The island's first regional government was elected in the same year. The central government's failure to hold any local election in the years thereafter caused another popular protest in June 2006 that forced Príncipe's regional government to step down.

Population

Settlements

The main settlement is the town of Santo António. Other settlements are:

Aeroporto
Belo Monte
Bom Viver
Hospital Velho
Ilhéu Bom Bom
Nova Estrela
Picão
Portinho
Porto Real
Praia Inhame
Santa Rita
São Joaquim
Sundy (or Sundi)
Terreiro Velho

Notable persons 
 Damião Vaz d'Almeida, a former president of the regional government of Príncipe from 1995 to 2002, and subsequently a prime minister of São Tomé and Príncipe from 2004 to 2005.

See also
List of presidents of the Regional Government of Príncipe

References

External links
 Map of Príncipe
 Principe portal
 Histórias da Ilha do Príncipe

Príncipe
Príncipe
Príncipe
1995 establishments in São Tomé and Príncipe
States and territories established in 1995